The Adirondack Jr. Thunder are a junior ice hockey team in the  Eastern Hockey League Premier based in Glens Falls, New York. They were established in 2022, and play home games out of the Cool Insuring Arena.

Team
The team was announced on January 20, 2022, under the ownership of Todd Tierney and Tadd Sipowicz, and is managed by Jeff Mead. Sipowicz and Mead are the Chief Revenue Officer and President of Business Operations, respectively, for the ECHL's Adirondack Thunder.

On the same day, they announced the team's first head coach would be Adirondack Red Wings all-time points and games-played leader Glenn Merkosky. Merkosky has head coaching experience with the Sudbury Wolves from 1992 to 1996, and the Adirondack Red Wings from 1996 to 1999.

They play in the  Eastern Hockey League Premier (EHLP) a development league for the Eastern Hockey League, within  Tier III junior hockey.

The team fills a gap in Upstate New York hockey, citing the loss of local youth players to other areas to play junior hockey before college. The team is largely made up of local players from the Glens Falls and  Albany area.

Season-by-season records
Updated December 27, 2022.

Players and personnel

Current roster
Updated October 26, 2022.

Head Coaches
Glenn Merkosky, 2022–present

References

External links
Adirondack Jr. Thunder Website

Ice hockey teams in New York (state)
Ice hockey clubs established in 2022
2022 establishments in New York (state)
Sports in Glens Falls, New York